Tony Yoka vs Carlos Takam was a professional boxing match contested between French boxer, Tony Yoka, and French-Cameroonian boxer, Carlos Takam.

The bout took place on March 11, 2023, at the Accor Arena in Paris, France.

Background

Yoka was expected to face Carlos Takam on January 15, 2022, in a fight which was supposed to take place at the Accor Arena in Paris, France. Shortly after the bout was scheduled however, Takam withdrew due to injury. On December 10, 2021, it was announced that Martin Bakole would step in as Takam's replacement. The fight was postponed on December 28, 2021, due to measures imposed to combat the spread of COVID-19. Yoka instead chose to enter negotiations to face Filip Hrgović in an IBF title eliminator. The IBF later ruled Yoka ineligible to enter an agreement with any opponent other than Martin Bakole, as the two had already signed contracts to face each other. Yoka's fight with Bakole was rescheduled for May 14. He lost the fight by majority decision, after suffering two knockdowns, in the first and fifth rounds.

Fight card

References

Boxing matches
Events in Paris
2023 in boxing
March 2023 sports events in France